Alfred Henry Phillips Sr. (July 27, 1908 – July 28, 1994) was a Canadian diver and curler. He competed in diving at the 1928 Summer Olympics and in the 1932 Summer Olympics. He was born in Durham and died in Toronto.

In 1928 he finished seventh in the 3 metre springboard event as well as seventh in the 10 metre platform competition. Four years later he finished fourth in the 1932 3 metre springboard event and again seventh in the 1932 10 metre platform contest. At the 1930 Empire Games, he won the gold medals in both diving events.

Phillips turned professional in 1935, becoming a circus high diver, and toured for the next 15 years. 
 
Phillips was posthumously inducted into the Canada's Sports Hall of Fame in 2015.

His son, Alf Phillips Jr. is a prominent curler, winner of the 1967 Macdonald Brier and bronze medallist at the 1967 Scotch Cup. Phillips Sr. also was an accomplished curler, representing Ontario at the 1956 Brier, and was the winner of the 1969 Canadian Senior Curling Championships, winning in Hamilton, Ontario, the same city he won golds at the 1935 British Empire Games.

References

External links

1908 births
1994 deaths
Sportspeople from Durham, England
Olympic divers of Canada
Divers at the 1928 Summer Olympics
Divers at the 1932 Summer Olympics
Divers at the 1930 British Empire Games
Commonwealth Games gold medallists for Canada
Canadian male divers
Commonwealth Games medallists in diving
English emigrants to Canada
Curlers from Toronto
Divers from Toronto
Canadian male curlers
20th-century Canadian people
Medallists at the 1930 British Empire Games